Numerus (Latin: "number") may refer to one of the following

Grammatical number
Numerus, a military unit of the Roman army

See also
Roman numerals